is a Japanese light novel series written by Gakuto Mikumo and illustrated by G-Yuusuke. The series started serialization in Kadokawa Shoten's light novel magazine The Sneaker on February 29, 2008. A manga adaptation by Chako Abeno started serialization in Kadokawa Shoten's shōnen manga magazine Shōnen Ace on March 26, 2010. Another manga adaptation by Monaco Sena started serialization in Kadokawa Shoten's seinen manga magazine Comp Ace on March 26, 2010. A 12-episode anime adaptation by Gainax aired between July and October, 2011.

Plot
This story takes place in England after World War I. After the death of his grandfather, Hugh Anthony Disward, also known as Huey, receives a mysterious key and according to his grandfather's will, must take custody of the Bibliotheca Mystica de Dantalian in order to inherit his estate and all his possessions. Upon meeting Dalian, a child living at the estate, he learns that she is the guardian of the Archives which contain forbidden knowledge stored in thousands of magic books called . Upon agreeing to become Dalian's new Keykeeper, Huey joins her into investigating incidents regarding people misusing the power of the Phantom Books, most of them with tragic consequences, and using his power as Keykeeper to seal the power of the Phantom Books and restore order to the area.

Characters

The , or Black Biblioprincess. She is a beautiful young girl with long black hair tinted purple and large dark pink eyes, and a metal box with a lock at her collar, where a ribbon would normally go. She is the custodian of the Bibliotheca Mystica de Dantalian housing 900,666 Phantom Books. In novel volume 1 chapter 4 Huey is looking for the library his grandfather left him, but can't find in his mansion. She asks him if he has heard of 'Vase World', of Chinese legend. She tells him that it eventually came into the possession of his grandfather. In the last pages of the chapter Huey learns that Dalian is the vase world, and inside her is contained the Bibliotheca Mystica de Dantalian. Because of this, she generally considers herself of great importance and believes herself to be more knowledgeable than most humans, even going so far as to praise others in a presumptuous manner when they exhibit more wisdom than she anticipated. She also has another self. She appears as the mysterious librarian inside the archives of the Bibliotheca Mystica de Dantalian. In the last episode of the anime television series, her "other self" overlaps with the current one in an attempt to save Huey when he almost lost his conscience in the Bibliotheca Mystica de Dantalian. When asked a question that calls for a "Yes" or "No" answer, she will reply appropriately in English rather than Japanese. She is often seen as a judgmental and arbitrary character, which clashes with her unexpected weakness for sweets; whenever presented with something sweet, or the opportunity to eat something sweet, a small lock of her hair will flick out from the rest of her head. She and Huey appear to share a very formal and business-like, but in reality is a really lighthearted and caring, relationship. She is shown to be considerate of others but reluctant to show as much in a tsundere fashion style.

Dalian's Keykeeper, also known as Huey. A handsome young man with wavy dark blonde hair and sharp sapphire eyes, he is a former Royal Air Force Pilot and the grandson of the previous Keykeeper Sir Wesley Disward, who left Huey the Bibliotheca Mystica de Dantalian and Dalian in his will. He is often seen as a calm and generally unfazed character who takes everything in stride, as he accepted his new-found responsibilities as the Keeper of the Bibliotheca Mystica de Dantalian without much question or argument. When he retrieves books from Dalian, he appears as a young child inside of the archives, speaking with a girl dressed in white with silver pigtails and purple eyes. A mysterious girl who lives inside the Dantalian Library. The girl's nature is unclear. Her true name is not known, but she is Dalian's "other self."; One thing is clear,though, which is that she and Huey share a keen personal relationship for reasons currently unknown. In the novel volume 2 chapter 9 of the arc "The Pop-Up Book", it is revealed that the girl inside the library of Dantalian was Dalian; She was actually the one that entrusted the key to the young Huey when he got lost inside the archives. In there he promised her that one day he would take her to the outside world. In the last episode of the anime television series, the promise is kept on hold; Also, he still doesn't know that the girl inside the archives is actually Dalian "other self." He sees her as another individual person without knowing who she really is.

The  or Silver Biblioprincess, otherwise known as the custodian of the Long-Lost Library. She is often called just "Flam" for short. She appears to be a girl in her teenage years, with long silver hair and sharp magenta eyes. She wears a white straitjacket with nine padlocks, although she says that she chose to wear it herself because she thought it "matches Hal's tastes". Flamberge, like Dalian, is a 'vase world', containing a library inside her. In contrast to Huey's technique of retrieving Phantom Books from Dalian, the method used by Hal to retrieve books from Flam in the novel is very similar but requires a bit more unwrapping. When he asks her "Art thou mankind--?" she shakes her hair and laughs madly while he unwraps her, before answering. In the anime the retrieval is shown to be very raw, painful and less dignified. Flamberge is often seen as a very arrogant and unpleasantly blunt character, and enjoys harassing Hal by accusing him of having perverted tendencies or a dirty mind. But she is also described as having read fairy tales to Mabel Nash's younger sister in novel Volume 1 Chapter 5.

Flamberge's Keykeeper. He has sharp blue eyes and long side-swept brown hair. He and Flam do not have a very good relationship, and he will often use the phrase "Keep your mouth shut, you piece of junk" in response to Flam's endless accusations of him being a pervert, making it almost something of a catchphrase for him. In the novel, like Huey, he has a jewel embedded in the back of his right hand. When he uses it he also holds a bunch of golden keys, which he uses to unlock the locks of Flamberge's straitjacket. Rather than reading the Phantom Books he retrieves from the Long-Lost Library, he places them in the Staff of Surtr that he carries, and uses the book as fuel for the fire the staff produces, burning any Phantom Books he comes across along with the memories the current owner had in relation to them. Thus, because of this, he refers himself as a "Libricide Officer". He is often seen as a very serious and highly observant character, and appears to have highly advanced deduction and cognitive abilities.

The  or Red Biblioprincess, otherwise known as the custodian of the Bibliotheca Razielis Archangeli. A girl with the appearance of a small child with short green hair. Her right eye is green [novel] or golden [anime], while her left eye is covered with a metal eyepatch of dark gray lustre, and a big keyhole in it. In the novels she is first seen in Volume 1 Special Chapter 1 - The Book of Dictators, by herself. In that chapter she frequently says "How idiotic!" In the anime she is first seen in episode 11. She has a very strong sense of balance, and tends to leap very slowly and gracefully or twirl atop of furniture without much trouble. She will answer "Yes" or "No" questions in German rather than Japanese. It seems that she doesn't have any issues with the Professor's intentions, and seems to enjoy watching his plans unfold. She has an uncannily calm persona, and doesn't show much consideration for typical human affairs, such as death, pain, destruction, and so on. She and Dalian appear to share a very vicious and spiteful relationship.

Raziel's Keykeeper. A man with long light blonde hair braided into a plait over his left shoulder, a mole on the lower left-hand corner of his mouth, and dark circles under his faded purple eyes. He was an old bartender at the camp Huey was assigned to during the war. His reason for contracting with Raziel is to create more Phantom Books and bring destruction wherever they go. It is indicated throughout the first anime season that he and Raziel gave out Phantom Books or manipulated people into creating more, causing mayhem both indirectly as well as directly. Outwardly he tends to look and act pleasantly but in reality he speaks and acts in a cold-blooded and arduous manner. Because Huey and Dalian's intentions with the Phantom Books are not like his own, he considers them a nuisance and attempts to kill them on several occasions. It is implied he has greater intentions than simply creating new Phantom Books, as he speaks of "creating a new world."

A childhood friend of Huey, Camilla is a woman with large green eyes and bright blonde hair, which she keeps non-traditionally short, claiming it is a trend from the New World that will soon catch on. Similarly, she also dresses in fashions or "trends" from across the globe, which she picked up while traveling. Dalian usually calls her a spinster, and seems to harbor a dislike for Camilla, but she does not let this bother her and tries to get on Dalian's good side by presenting her with sweets, a weakness of Dalian's that she picked up on fairly quickly. She works as a teacher and runs a school for the neighborhood children. She seems to have some knowledge of the Phantom Books due to an incident with the Book of Wisdom and the Book of Equivalence. She is often seen as a very bright-spirited and cheery person, and she seems to be the least serious person in a dire situation; rather, her personality will become curiously confused or distraught.

A friend of Huey's, Armand is a man with short dark blond hair and meek dark purple eyes who was assigned to the same air base as Huey when they were both working as Air Force pilots during the war. His father is the owner of a famous shipbuilding company. Because Huey was his superior commanding officer during the war, he has a habit of calling him "Lieutenant," despite Huey's attempts to get him to drop the title. He seems to have some knowledge of the Phantom Books due to an incident when a courtesan he was infatuated with requested him to bring her the Salamander's Tablet (and he even used the Phantom Book himself while protecting her from a magician), as well as the Book of Relationship. He is often seen as a very dramatic and love-sick person, especially in the presence of his current crush.

A student at the boarding school where Huey's aunt Ms. Rodean serves as the principal. Both first appear in novel Volume 4. At the end of the chapter Huey's aunt Ms. Rodean asks him if he has thought of marriage, and suggests Jessica to him.

Media

Light novels
Between February 29, 2008 and February 28, 2011, eight light novels were serialized in The Sneaker. They were subsequently published under Kadokawa Shoten's Kadokawa Sneaker Bunko imprint, with the eighth volume released on July 1, 2011.

Manga
The Mystic Archives of Dantalian has received three manga adaptions, all of which have reached completion. The first, sharing the name of the novels, began serialization in Shōnen Ace on March 26, 2010 and ran for five volumes until July 26, 2012. The second, Dantalian Days, began serialization in Comp Ace on March 26, 2010 and ran for two volumes until October 26, 2011. The third, a yonkoma spinoff titled Dalian-chan no Shoka, began serialization in 4-koma nano ace on July 7, 2011 and ran for one volume until July 9, 2012.

The Mystic Archives of Dantalian

Dantalian no Shoka: Dalian Days

Dalian-chan no Shoka

Anime
In June 2010, Kadokawa announced that an anime television adaption was being developed. Produced by Gainax under the direction of Yutaka Uemura, The series aired its broadcast run on TV Tokyo from July 16, 2011 to October 1, 2011. The series is also streamed with English subtitles by the media websites Crunchyroll and NicoNico. The opening theme is "Cras numquam scire" (To Never Know Tomorrow) by Yucca (feat. Daisuke Ono) while the ending theme is "yes, prisoner" by maRIONnetTe. Funimation has licensed the series for North America and released the series on subtitled DVD on February 14, 2017.

An OVA, "Ibarahime", was produced as a cross-promotion with the release of the manga The Mystical Archives of Dantalian, volume 5.

References

External links
Kadokawa Shoten's Dantalian no Shoka website 
TV Animation Dantalian no Shoka website 

2008 Japanese novels
2010 manga
Anime and manga based on light novels
Chako Abeno
Fantasy anime and manga
Funimation
Gainax
Japanese fantasy novels
Kadokawa Shoten manga
Kadokawa Sneaker Bunko
Kadokawa Dwango franchises
Light novels
Shōnen manga
TV Tokyo original programming